Church of God Mission International is a Christian denomination from Nigeria.  The headquarters is in Benin City, Nigeria, is a megachurch. It was Founded by Benson Idahosa in 1968.

See also

Christianity in Nigeria
Nigerian sectarian violence

References

External links
Official website of Church of God Mission

African initiated churches
Christian denominations in Nigeria